Fairfield Hospital may refer to:

Fairfield Hospital (Sydney), in Sydney, Australia
Fairfield Hospital, Bedfordshire, in Fairfield Park, Bedfordshire, England
Fairfield Infectious Diseases Hospital, in Melbourne, Australia
Fairfield General Hospital, in Bury, England.